Iscadia aperta is a moth of the family Nolidae. It is found in Arizona and Texas, Central America, South America and the Antilles.

References

Nolidae
Moths of North America
Moths of the Caribbean
Moths of Central America
Moths of South America
Moths of Cuba
Lepidoptera of Brazil
Lepidoptera of Jamaica
Moths described in 1857